Julien Ranouil (born 26 January 1981 in Bergerac), known by his stage name Pakito or Karlux, is a French electronic dance music artist. His cover of Trans-X's "Living on Video" reached number one on France's singles chart. Later hits are "Moving on Stereo" and "Are U Ready". So far his music style can be best determined as Eurodance. His name is taken from 'Paquito el Chocolatero', a famous pasodoble dance from Alicante, in the Comunidad Valenciana region of Spain.

His album Video was released on 8 November 2006 in the United States.

Discography

Albums
2006: Video

Singles
2006: "Living On Video"
2006: "Moving On Stereo"
2007: "Are You Ready"
2007: "You Wanna Rock"
2008: "Electro Music"
2009: "Harmony"
2009: "Living on Video 2.9"
2017: "Accordion"

Bootlegs
2006: "Moving to the Beat" (Pakito vs. Black & White Brothers)

References

External links
 Discogs on Pakito

French DJs
French electronic musicians
Eurodance musicians
Remixers
Living people
1981 births
People from Bergerac, Dordogne
Electronic dance music DJs